Peter Cakebread is a game designer who has worked primarily on role-playing games.

Career
Peter Cakebread formed the game company Cakebread & Walton with Ken Walton.  They were licensees for Mongoose Publishing's RuneQuest II system and used that to create the Clockwork & Chivalry alternate history, which is set during the English Civil War, in 1645.Cakebread has worked on numerous games and systems including Clockwork & Chivalry, Airship Pirates, Dark Streets, the Renaissance d100 rules, Pirates & Dragons and the popular One Dice rules.

Cakebread has also written the novel The Alchemist's Revenge (2013), and was the lead author of the mystery novel The Morecambe Medium (2014).

References

Living people
Place of birth missing (living people)
Role-playing game designers
Year of birth missing (living people)